Best of the Worst may refer to:

 Best of the Worst, a web series by Red Letter Media
 Best of the Worst (game show), a 2006 British panel game television programme hosted by Alexander Armstrong which aired on Channel 4
 Best of the Worst (TV program), a 1991–1992 American television program hosted by Greg Kinnear which aired on Fox
 Best of the Worst: 93–97, a 1999 compilation album from the Memphis-based garage-rock band, the Oblivians